Oleksandr Golovash (born 21 September 1991) is a Ukrainian racing cyclist, who currently rides for UCI Continental team . He rode at the 2014 UCI Road World Championships.

Major results

2012
 National Road Championships
1st  Road race
1st  Time trial
 3rd Time trial, UEC European Under-23 Road Championships
2013
 1st  Time trial, National Under-23 Road Championships
 2nd Time trial, UEC European Under-23 Road Championships
2014
 1st Stage 1 Tour of Szeklerland
2015
 1st Minsk Cup
 1st Stage 3b Tour of Szeklerland
 6th Overall Tour of China II
2016
 1st Prologue Tour of Taihu Lake
 3rd Odessa Grand Prix
 4th Tour de Ribas
 6th Overall Sharjah International Cycling Tour
 9th Overall Tour of Ukraine
1st Stage 2a (TTT)
 10th Overall Tour of Szeklerland
2017
 1st Stage 6 La Tropicale Amissa Bongo
 5th Overall Tour of Ukraine
 6th Tour de Ribas
 7th Minsk Cup
 10th Odessa Grand Prix
2018
 1st Stage 2 Tour International de la Wilaya d'Oran
 3rd Time trial, National Road Championships
 4th Race Horizon Park Maidan
2019
 1st Tour of Poyang Lake
 3rd Time trial, National Road Championships
 3rd Chabany Race
 4th Tour de Ribas
 6th Odessa Grand Prix
 9th Overall Tour of Małopolska
1st Stage 2

References

External links
 

1991 births
Living people
Ukrainian male cyclists
Sportspeople from Sumy
European Games competitors for Ukraine
Cyclists at the 2019 European Games